The FitzPatrick Institute of African Ornithology is a South African biological research and conservation institute based at the University of Cape Town.  The mission statement of the institute is “to promote and undertake scientific studies involving birds, and contribute to the practice affecting the maintenance of biological diversity and the sustained use of biological resources”.

History
The FitzPatrick Institute was founded in 1959 through the efforts and financial support of Cecily Niven, the daughter of Sir Percy FitzPatrick, and was originally incorporated as a non-profit company.  It is now incorporated within the University of Cape Town as an autonomous subunit within the department of Zoology. It houses the Niven Library and has become the largest centre for ornithological research in the Southern Hemisphere. The name was changed in 2018 from the "Percy Fitzpatrick Institute of Ornithology".

Research

As of the end of 2006, research programs and initiatives included:
 Systematics and biogeography
 Life history strategies
 Cooperative breeding and sociality in birds
 Ecology of migration
 Ecological and evolutionary physiology
 Rarity and conservation biology of southern African birds
 Island conservation
 Seabird research
 Raptor research
 Gamebird research
 Spatial parasitology and epidemiology
 Pattern process linkages in landscape ecology
 Environmental and resource economics, water resources and estuarine ecology, and conservation
 Climate change vulnerability and adaptation

References
 Percy FitzPatrick Institute Annual Report, January-December 2006 downloaded 2 November 2007

External links
 Percy FitzPatrick Institute of African Ornithology

Ornithological organizations
Biological research institutes
1959 establishments in South Africa
University of Cape Town
Organizations established in 1959
Animal welfare organisations based in South Africa
Research institutes in South Africa